Cauayan can refer to the following places in the Philippines:

 Cauayan, Isabela, a city
 Cauayan, Negros Occidental, a municipality

See also
 Caoayan, a municipality in the province of Ilocos Sur, Philippines
 Kawayan, a municipality in the province of Biliran, Philippines